Michaël Rossi (born 12 April 1988 in Chambéry) is a French racing driver.

Career
After racing in karting, Rossi raced in the Championnat de France Formula Renault 2.0 in 2006 driving for both SG Formula and Hexis Racing. However he only scored one point in 11 races, placing him 21st in the standings.

In 2007, Rossi raced in the Eurocup Mégane Trophy with the Racing for Belgium team, finishing ninth in the standings with one victory. For 2008 he moved to the TDS Racing team, taking four wins on the way to the championship title.

In 2009 Rossi moved to the SEAT León Eurocup, a support series for the World Touring Car Championship, driving a SUNRED Engineering-prepared car. He scored a victory at Brno and at Imola. He finished sixth in the standings after missing two of the six rounds in mid-season. He did a few races of the Spanish series, and scored a podium in his one-off Mégane Trophy return.

As the overall winner of the León Eurocup weekend in Imola, Rossi made his World Touring Car Championship debut at the 2010 FIA WTCC Race of Japan at Okayama driving for SR-Sport.

Racing record

Career summary

† - Unlicensed driver: allowed to race without scoring. ‡ - As Rossi was a guest driver, he was ineligible for points.

Complete WTCC results
(key) (Races in bold indicate pole position) (Races in italics indicate fastest lap)

Complete GT1 World Championship results

References

External links
 
 

1988 births
Living people
Sportspeople from Chambéry
French racing drivers
Italian Formula Renault 2.0 drivers
British Formula Renault 2.0 drivers
French Formula Renault 2.0 drivers
World Touring Car Championship drivers
SEAT León Eurocup drivers
Eurocup Mégane Trophy drivers
FIA GT1 World Championship drivers
European Touring Car Cup drivers
TDS Racing drivers
SG Formula drivers
Cupra Racing drivers
Boutsen Ginion Racing drivers